is a spin-off installment in the Monster Hunter series, developed by FromSoftware and published by Capcom for the PlayStation Portable. It was released in Japan on August 26, 2010. The word  is the Japanese equivalent of felyne (Ailuro is the Greek word for cat), a fictional sapient cat species that appears in the Monster Hunter games.  The player gives orders to the felynes to progress to the end of quests instead of having direct control over them. The game uses a more cartoonish art style as opposed to the more realistic style seen in the main Monster Hunter games. More emphasis is placed on style and village management. A few Hello Kitty items are also available in the game.

 is an expansion pack and was released in August 2011.  is a series of ten television shorts developed to help advertise Poka Poka Airou Village. They feature felynes attempting quests and almost invariably failing at them.  One episode also has a Chibiterasu cameo. A Nintendo 3DS version of the game, titled  was released in Japan in 2015.

References

External links
Official site (Japanese)
Official site (G) (Japanese)

2010 video games
FromSoftware games
Japan-exclusive video games
Monster Hunter
PlayStation Portable games
Nintendo 3DS games
Nintendo 3DS eShop games
Video games developed in Japan
Video games scored by Yuji Takenouchi
Fictional cats
Video game spin-offs